John Gordon (born March 27, 1958, in Ashland, Wisconsin) is an American curler. He is a two-time Olympian, having competed at the 1998 Winter Olympics in Nagano and the 2002 Winter Olympics in Salt Lake City, finishing 4th and 7th respectively. He also represented the United States at the World Curling Championships three times, finishing 4th in 1995, 6th in 1996, and 4th in 1999.

Teams 
1998 Winter Olympics

 Tim Somerville, Skip
 Mike Peplinski, Third
 Myles Brundidge, Second
 John Gordon, Lead

2002 Winter Olympics, 1995 World Men's Championship, 1996 World Men's Championship

 Tim Somerville, Skip
 Mike Schneeberger, Third
 Myles Brundidge, Second
 John Gordon, Lead

1999 World Men's Championship

 Tim Somerville, Skip
Donald Barcome Jr., Third
 Myles Brundidge, Second
 John Gordon, Lead

References

External links 
 
 John Gordon | Olympic.org

1958 births
Living people
People from Ashland, Wisconsin
American male curlers
Olympic curlers of the United States
Curlers at the 1998 Winter Olympics
Curlers at the 2002 Winter Olympics
American curling champions
Sportspeople from Wisconsin